Birgit Henriette Borgersen Wiig (7 April 1928 – 29 May 1998) was a Norwegian newspaper editor and politician.

She was born in Askim to Halfdan Borgersen and Irma Hertha Neubauer, and graduated as cand.mag. in literary history at the University of Oslo in 1955. She was editor of the newspaper Øvre Smaalenene from 1957 to 1985, and from 1990 to 1993. For 25 years she was the only female member of the Association of Norwegian Editors. From 1968 to 1973 she chaired the Norwegian National Women's Council. From 1973 to 1977 she was deputy representative at the Storting from Østfold.

References

1928 births
1998 deaths
Norwegian newspaper editors
Norwegian women editors
University of Oslo alumni
Østfold politicians
People from Askim
Deputy members of the Storting
Norwegian Association for Women's Rights people